Primula sikkimensis (Himalayan cowslip, Sikkim cowslip) is a species of flowering plant in the family Primulaceae, native to the Himalayan region at altitudes of , from western Nepal to south west China. The flowers may be covered by a mealy-white layer (farina).

This plant is suitable for cultivation in partial shade, in soil that remains moist at all times. It has gained the Royal Horticultural Society's Award of Garden Merit.

References

 The Plant List entry
 Online Atlas of the British & Irish Flora entry

sikkimensis
Flora of Tibet
Flora of China
Flora of East Himalaya
Flora of Nepal
Plants described in 1851